Jean Moulin (F785) is a  in the French Navy.

Design 

Armed by a crew of 90 sailors, these vessels have the reputation of being among the most difficult in bad weather. Their high windage makes them particularly sensitive to pitch and roll as soon as the sea is formed.

Their armament, consequent for a vessel of this tonnage, allows them to manage a large spectrum of missions. During the Cold War, they were primarily used to patrol the continental shelf of the Atlantic Ocean in search of Soviet Navy submarines. Due to the poor performance of the hull sonar, as soon as an echo appeared, the reinforcement of an ASM frigate was necessary to chase it using its towed variable depth sonar.

Their role as patrollers now consists mainly of patrols and assistance missions, as well as participation in UN missions (blockades, flag checks) or similar marine policing tasks (fight against drugs, extraction of nationals, fisheries control, etc.). The mer-mer 38 or mer-mer 40 missiles have been landed, but they carry several machine guns and machine guns, more suited to their new missions.

Its construction cost was estimated at 270,000,000 French francs.

Construction and career 
Jean Moulin was laid down on 15 January 1975 at Arsenal de Lorient, Lorient. Launched on 31 January 1976 and commissioned on 11 May 1977.

First based in Brest, she was assigned to Noumea between 1986 and 1987.

She was then reassigned to Brest and then withdrawn from service on 14 May 1999. She was officially decommissioned in 1999, she served from 1999 to 2014 as a breakwater at Lanvéoc-Poulmic.

In 2014, the Jean Moulin left the scene to join the port of Brest and be prepared for its dismantling.

At the beginning of February 2015, she joined the scrapyard in Ghent, Belgium, to be dismantled by the Franco-Belgian group Galloo.

Citations 

Ships built in Lorient
1976 ships
D'Estienne d'Orves-class avisos